Carl-Hermann Gustav "Calle" Schlettwein (born 13 June 1954) is a Namibian politician who has served in the country's cabinet since 2012. In March 2020, he was appointed the Minister of Agriculture, Water and Land Reform after serving as the Minister of Finance from 2015 to 2020 and previously as the Minister of Trade and Industry from 2012 to 2015.

Early life
Schlettwein is of German Namibian descent. He attended the Deutsche Höhere Privatschule Windhoek. Between 1974 and 1980 Schlettwein studied Entomology, Zoology and Botany at the University of Stellenbosch. Later he worked as researcher in the Department  of  Water  Affairs.

Career
Beginning at Namibian Independence in 1990, Schlettwein served as permanent secretary in various ministries. After seven years of deployment in the Ministry of Finance, President Hifikepunye Pohamba appointed Schlettwein to the National Assembly as one of the six non-voting Members of Parliament appointed by the President for the term that began in March 2010. He was then appointed as Deputy Minister of Finance in 2010. In a Cabinet reshuffle following the 2012 SWAPO congress, Schlettwein was promoted to Minister of Trade and Industry on 4 December 2012. In this position, he became the first white senior cabinet member since the early post-independence years.

Under president Hage Geingob, Schlettwein was moved to the post of Minister of Finance in March 2015. After Geingob's reelection in 2019, Schlettwein was moved to lead the Ministry of Agriculture, Water and Land Reform.

Other activities
 African Development Bank (AfDB), Ex-Officio Member of the Board of Governors (since 2015)
 International Monetary Fund (IMF), Ex-Officio Member of the Board of Governors (since 2015)
 Multilateral Investment Guarantee Agency (MIGA), World Bank Group, Ex-Officio Member of the Board of Governors (since 2015)
 World Bank, Ex-Officio Member of the Board of Governors (since 2015)

Recognition
On Heroes' Day 2014, Schlettwein was conferred the Most Excellent Order of the Eagle, Second Class.

References

1954 births
Living people
People from Otjiwarongo
Namibian people of German descent
White Namibian people
SWAPO politicians
Finance ministers of Namibia
Trade and industry ministers of Namibia
Agriculture ministers of Namibia